Josep Escolà Segalés (28 August 1914 – 7 March 1998), also referred to as José Escolà, was a Spanish footballer who played as a forward. He spent most of his club career at FC Barcelona. Escolà also played for both Spain and the Catalan XI. After retiring as player in 1948, Escolà managed  CF Badalona, CE Sabadell FC, CD Castellón and Levante UD.

Playing career

Club

FC Barcelona
Born in Barcelona, Catalonia, Escolà made his La Liga debut for FC Barcelona under Franz Platko on 2 December 1934 and scored the fourth goal in a 4-0 win against Arenas Club de Getxo at Les Corts. During his debut season with the club, he helped them win the Campionat de Catalunya. Under Platko’s successor, Patrick O'Connell, and with a team that also included Domènec Balmanya, Joan Josep Nogués and Enrique Fernández, he helped the club win a further Campionat de Catalunya and reach the  1936 Copa del Presidente de la República Final. Barça played Madrid CF and with the Madrid club leading 2-1, Escolà was denied a late equalizer after a spectacular save by Ricardo Zamora.

Civil War and Exile
During the following season, 1936–37, national football was suspended because of the Spanish Civil War. However FC Barcelona and other clubs in the Republican area of Spain competed in the Mediterranean League and Escolà, Balmanya and O’Connell helped the club win this title. In 1937 FC Barcelona, including Escolà, Balmanya and O’Connell, went on a fund raising tour to Mexico and the United States. The club played fourteen games and opponents included Club América, Atlante F.C., Necaxa and a Mexican XI. In the United States, FC Barcelona played in and won a tournament against a Brooklyn XI, a New York XI and a Hebrew XI and then played a USA XI. In financial terms this tour saved the club, but O’Connell returned to Spain with only four players. The remaining players went into exile and Escolà and Balmanya signed for FC Sète in France.

FC Barcelona
After the Spanish Civil War ended in 1939, Francoist Spain imposed a six-year ban on any exiled sportsmen  returning to Spain. However Enrique Piñeyro, the president of  CF Barcelona, campaigned in favour of several of the club’s players and Escolà and Balmanya returned from exile in 1941. During their first season back, Barça, with Joan Josep Nogués now as coach, narrowly avoided being relegated after winning a play-off against Real Murcia. Despite this however the club managed to win the Copa del Generalísimo, with Escolà scoring their two opening goals, as they beat Atlético Bilbao 4–3 after extra time.

In 1943 Escolà also played in the controversial Copa del Generalísimo semi-final against Real Madrid. During the first-leg at Les Corts, which Barça won 3–0, he was severely kicked in the stomach   and had to retire from the game. In the return leg they were beaten 11–1 at the Charmartín. It has been alleged that the Barça players, including Escolà, were pressurised into losing the game by supporters of Francoist Spain. However, the historian Bernardo Salazar interviewed both Escolà and Balmanya, who were part of the squad back then, and both denied these facts.

Towards the end of Escolà’s playing career with CF Barcelona, the squad was reinforced with among others, Mariano Martín, Josep Gonzalvo, Marià Gonzalvo, César, Velasco and later, Estanislao Basora and Antoni Ramallets.  In his last years with the club, Escolà helped Barça win La Liga twice, under coach Josep Samitier in 1945 and under coach  Enrique Fernández in 1948.

International
Between 1931 and 1948, Escolà also played 10 games and scored twice for the Catalan XI. The first of his two goals was scored in a 2–1 win against Brazil at Les Corts on 17 June 1934. He also played twice for Spain, both times against Portugal. Both games finished as 2–2 draws and Escolà scored on his debut on 12 January 1941. The second game was played on 11 March 1945.

Honours

Player
Barcelona
La Liga: 1944–45, 1947–48
Copa del Rey: 1942; runner-up: 1936
Supercopa de España: 1945
Mediterranean League: 1937
Campionat de Catalunya: 1934–35, 1935–36

Manager
Levante
Tercera División: 1955–56

Club statistics
Continental includes the Catalan Championship and the Copa de Oro Argentina.

Sources

 Barça: A People’s Passion (1998), Jimmy Burns.

External links
Spain stats
Bio at www.fcbarcelonaonline.com

1914 births
1998 deaths
Spanish footballers
Spanish football managers
Spanish expatriate footballers
Spain international footballers
La Liga players
FC Barcelona players
FC Sète 34 players
CE Sabadell FC managers
CD Castellón managers
Levante UD managers
Footballers from Barcelona
Expatriate footballers in France
Spanish expatriate sportspeople in France
Catalonia international footballers
Association football forwards
UE Sants players
RCD Espanyol footballers